Petra Wassiluk (born 27 October 1969) is a German long-distance runner. She competed in the women's 5000 metres at the 1996 Summer Olympics.

References

1969 births
Living people
Athletes (track and field) at the 1996 Summer Olympics
Athletes (track and field) at the 2000 Summer Olympics
German female long-distance runners
Olympic athletes of Germany
Place of birth missing (living people)